Tomislav Goluban (born 1976) is a Croatian blues singer-songwriter and harmonica player, composer, band leader, blues educator, radio DJ and festival organiser. As of 2021, he has put out 12 studio albums.

Biography 
Goluban was born in a house by the railroad track in Grabrovec (Zabok, Croatia) in Hrvatsko Zagorje, where he still lives. He began playing the harp back in 1997, and his main drive was to revive the legacy of country/delta blues expression. He was inspired to do this after listening to Sonny Terry records. In his songs, Goluban combines country blues with Croatian traditional music. His nickname Little Pigeon is a liberal translation of his last name to English. 
Performing as a solo artist, as part of a duo and performing with a band, Goluban has played in the United States and across many European countries at festivals and events such as the International Blues Challenge (USA), Notodden Blues Festival (Norway), Amal's Blues Festival (Sweden) and Blues sur Seine (France). He also came fourth place at World Harmonica Festival 2005 (Trossingen, Germany; Category: solo diatonic Blues/Rock/Folk/Country), and in 2004 the German website Harp Online, specialized in harmonica, proclaimed him "the player with the most ruthless scene performance ever."

He won a couple of annual Croatian most prestigious national music awards ("Porin", "Status"), he is the founder of folk blues festival in his hometown region, he hosts a radio show specialized in blues on Croatian Radio, and was one of the founders and the first president of the "Croatian Blues Forces" association (national blues society) which won "Keeping the Blues Alive" award in 2019.

His songs combine the genres of delta, country & Chicago blues, zydeco, rock'n'roll and world music. His music arrangements are various, ranging from raw delta duo sound to the full instrumental arrangement with 20 musicians playing one song.
 
His 10th album Chicago Rambler charted at No. 85 at Top 200 Blues Albums of 2019 by Roots Music Report. It also charted at No. 5 at the Chicago Blues chart.
His 11th album Memphis Light charted at No. 69 at Top 200 Blues Albums of 2020 by Roots Music Report, and it also charted at No. 41 at the Contemporary Blues chart.

Goluban also developed an educational blues music program, "The Harmonica in Blues". The program's aim is to inform children and pupils of basic terms in the world of harmonica and blues. It is presented to the pupils of elementary and high schools all over Croatia.

Discography

Studio albums 
 Pigeon's Flight / Tomislav Goluban & Little Pigeon's Forhill Blues (Aquarius Records/Spona, 2005)
 Mr. B. / Tomislav Goluban & Little Pigeon's Forhill Blues (Aquarius Records/Spona, 2007)
 Zagorje Blues / Tomislav Goluban & Little Pigeon's Forhill Blues (Aquarius Records/Spona, 2009)
 200$ SUN Memphis Album / Tomislav „Little Pigeon" Goluban (Croatia Records, 2010)
 Med bregi / Tomislav Goluban & Little Pigeon's Forhill Blues (Menart/Spona, 2012)
 Blow Junkie / Tomislav Goluban (Menart/Spona, 2014)
 For a Friend & Brother / Tomislav Goluban & Nebojša Buhin (Spona, 2015)
 Kaj Blues Etno / Tomislav Goluban (Spona, 2016)
 Velvet Space Love / Tomislav Goluban feat. Toni Starešinić (Spona, 2018)
 Chicago Rambler / Tomislav Goluban (Spona, 2019)
 Memphis Light / Tomislav Goluban (Spona, 2020)
 Express Connection / Tomislav Goluban (Blue Heart Records, 2021)

Awards (selection) 
 4 Croatian music awards "Porin" (2009, 2010, 2011 & 2013)
 3 Croatian Musicians Union awards "Status" (2008, 2009 & 2010)
 2 Fender Mega Muzika awards (2009 & 2012)
 4th place at Worlds Harmonica Championship in Trossingen, Germany, 2005.

References

External links 
  Tomislav Goluban – Official website
 HDS ZAMP / Baza autora: Tomislav Goluban (in Croatian)
 
 

1976 births
Living people
Blues rock musicians
Blues harmonica players
Blues singer-songwriters
Croatian singer-songwriters
20th-century Croatian male singers
21st-century Croatian male singers